Caloptilia hypericella is a moth of the family Gracillariidae. It is known from Canada (Québec) and the United States (Cincinnati, Ohio, Kentucky, Michigan and West Virginia).

The wingspan is about 8 mm.

The larvae feed on Hypericum cistifolium, Hypericum punctatum and Hypericum sphaerocarpum. They mine the leaves of their host plant. The mine has the form of a small linear mine on the upperside of the leaf, enlarged into an elongate blotch, which becomes tentiform, resembling a small Phyllonorycter mine.

References

External links
mothphotographersgroup

hypericella
Moths of North America
Moths described in 1918